The 2002 NBA All-Star Game was an exhibition basketball game which was played on February 10, 2002, at the First Union Center in Philadelphia, home of the Philadelphia 76ers. This game was the 51st edition of the North American NBA All-Star Game and was played during the 2001–02 NBA season.

The venue was originally scheduled for the 1998-99 NBA season, but was cancelled due to the 1998-99 NBA lockout and moved to 2002, which was the next All-Star game that had not yet been awarded to another city.

The West defeated the East 135–120, with Kobe Bryant of the Los Angeles Lakers winning the Most Valuable Player. Bryant scored 31 points, dished 5 assists, and grabbed 5 rebounds, despite being booed by the hometown crowd. Tracy McGrady led the way for the East, scoring 25 points off the bench. He also made one of the most memorable plays in All-Star Game history, the self pass off the backboard dunk.

This was also the last All-Star Game to feature players wearing their respective team jerseys, and thus far, the last to be seen on over-the-air television (all subsequent games have aired on the cable channel TNT).

All-Star Game

Coaches

The coach for the Western Conference team was Dallas Mavericks head coach Don Nelson. The Mavericks had a 35–14 record on February 10. The coach for the Eastern Conference team was New Jersey Nets head coach Byron Scott. The Nets had a 32–15 record on February 10.

Players

The rosters for the All-Star Game were chosen in two ways. The starters were chosen via a fan ballot. Two guards, two forwards and one center who received the highest vote were named the All-Star starters. The reserves were chosen by votes among the NBA head coaches in their respective conferences. The coaches were not permitted to vote for their own players. The reserves consist of two guards, two forwards, one center and two players regardless of position. If a player is unable to participate due to injury, the commissioner will select a replacement.

For the third consecutive year, Vince Carter of the Toronto Raptors topped the ballots with 1,470,176 votes, which earned him a starting position as a forward in the Eastern Conference team for the third year in a row. Allen Iverson, Michael Jordan, Antoine Walker, and Dikembe Mutombo completed the Eastern Conference starting position. This was the third consecutive All-Star appearance by Carter and Iverson, and Mutombo's eighth appearance as an All-Star. It also marked Jordan's 13th appearance as an All-Star, and the first after his return from retirement. The Eastern Conference reserves included four first-time selections, Shareef Abdur-Rahim, Baron Davis, Jermaine O'Neal, and Paul Pierce. Ray Allen, Jason Kidd, Tracy McGrady, and Alonzo Mourning rounded out the team. Two teams, Philadelphia 76ers, and Boston Celtics, had two representatives at the All-Star Game with Iverson/Mutombo, and Walker/Pierce.

For the second consecutive year, the Western Conference's leading vote-getter was Shaquille O'Neal, who earned his ninth consecutive All-Star Game selection with 1,247,438 votes. Steve Francis, Kobe Bryant, Kevin Garnett, and Tim Duncan completed the Western Conference starting positions. Bryant, Garnett, O'Neal, and Duncan were all starters for the previous year's Western Conference team. Francis became an All-Star for the first time. The Western Conference reserves include five first-time selections, Elton Brand, Steve Nash, Dirk Nowitzki, Peja Stojaković, and Wally Szczerbiak. The team is rounded out by Gary Payton, Chris Webber, and Karl Malone. Four teams, Los Angeles Lakers, Dallas Mavericks, Minnesota Timberwolves, and Sacramento Kings, had two representations at the All-Star Game with Bryant/O'Neal, Nash/Nowitzki, Garnett/Szczerbiak, and Webber/Stojaković.

Roster

 Vince Carter and Shaquille O'Neal were unable to participate due to injury.
  Shareef Abdur-Rahim and Elton Brand were named as Carter and O'Neal's replacements respectively.
 Jason Kidd and Chris Webber were named as starters, replacing Carter and O'Neal respectively

Game

All-Star Weekend

Rookie Challenge

NBA.com Slam Dunk Presented by RealOne

This year's contest adopted a new format. Two pairs of contestants faced each other, with the winner of each matchup advancing to the final round. Prior to each dunk, the players would spin a wheel to determine what kind of dunk they had to perform.

1 800 CALL ATT Shootout

989 Sports All-Star Hoop-It-Up

References

External links
 2002 NBA All-Star Game Homepage
 NBA All-Star 2002 Participants
 2002 All-Star Game Recap: NBA History
 2002 All-Star Game Box Score: NBA History

National Basketball Association All-Star Game
Basketball in Philadelphia
Sports competitions in Philadelphia
All-Star